Harmoni was a  provider of outsourced healthcare services including Out-of-hours services, NHS 111, prisoner healthcare and IT services.  It provided NHS services to more than eight million people in the UK.

It was created by a merger of ECI healthcare investment's WCI Group’s IT services division and the Harmoni GP cooperative. It was the most successful out-of-hours provider in winning the Government’s NHS 111 contracts in 2012.

It was sold in 2012 by ECI Partners to Care UK for about £50 million.

The company claimed that it made no profit out of the out-of-hours market. The Chair of Camden's Health Scrutiny Panel said the company won the Out-of-hours contract for Camden not on quality, but on price. They described the service as a loss-leader.  It lost the contract for Hackney to the GP co-operative, City and Hackney Urgent Healthcare Social Enterprise in October 2013.

See also
Private healthcare in the United Kingdom

References

Private providers of NHS services
Health care companies of the United Kingdom
2012 mergers and acquisitions